Kim Man Lui (雷剑文), also known as Kimman Lui, is an author of software engineering, and financial speculation books. He is the Chief Operations Officer of Marvel Web Services and a lecturer with the Hong Kong Polytechnic University. He has authored over 20 publications and written content for over 30 journals.

Lui performed an experiment in pair programming which confirmed that "novice–novice pairs against novice solos" show greater productivity gains than "expert–expert pairs against expert solos" (i.e., novices have more to learn that experts).  His books challenge the status quo regarding the development of software and financial speculation.

Personal background 
Kim Man Lui was born in Hong Kong and studied in Taiwan and South Africa. In 1992, Lui earned his bachelor's degree in engineering from Tamkang University and in 1995, he earned his master's degree from the University of the Witwatersrand in Johannesburg, South Africa. In 2006, he earned his doctorate from the Hong Kong Polytechnic University.

Professional background 
Lui is the Chief Operations Officer of Marvel Web Services. He has additionally held a number of IT positions in the commercial sector of Hong Kong and China. He was involved in the setup of a software center that adopts agile development in China. In 2004, he was involved in the open source development of Miranda IM.
 From 2006 to 2008, he served as Assistant Professor at Hong Kong Polytechnic University. In 2007, he developed a metasearch engine, in which the results are displayed on a China map.

Lui's research interests include software engineering and finance. He has published five software engineering books, including one focusing on Agile software development. While his books are generally written in Chinese, his book Software Development Rhythms was initially printed in English and later translated for Chinese readers. He provided translation for author Kent Beck and the second edition of his book, Extreme Programming Explained: Embrace Change.

, Lui latest publication is Truth Among Lies: Positive and Negative Cases of Technical Analysis, which focuses on stock market speculation in China. In this publication, he criticised other Chinese authors about their investment books, stating that they have misled the public in China. His criticism was ill-received and considered unprofessional, due to unspoken agreements not to challenge other authors.

Published works 
Books
 CMM: Software Development Process Management and Improvement, Tsinghua University Press, 2002.  
 Facts and Fictions in Extreme Programming Practices, Electronics Industry Publishing Company, 2005.  
 Software Development Rhythms, Wiley-Interscience, 2008.  
 Software Development Rhythms, (Chinese Title:) (Translated In Chinese by Yangyan et al.) Electronics Industry Publishing Company, 2010.  
 Truth Among Lies: Positive and Negative Cases of Technical Analysis, (Chinese Title:) China Economic Publishing House, 2012.

Translations 
 Beck, Kent. Extreme Programming Explained: Embrace Change (2nd Edition), China Machine Press, 2011. 
 Beck, Kent. Extreme Programming Explained: Embrace Change (2nd Edition), Electronics Industry Publishing Company, 2006.

References 

Living people
Date of birth missing (living people)
Chinese technology writers
Chinese software engineers
Chinese financial analysts
Hong Kong writers
Chinese computer scientists
Chinese chief operating officers
Year of birth missing (living people)